Dasopant (1551-1615) belonged to the Datta sect. He was born in a Deshastha Brahmin family in the village of Narayan Peth. He was the son of Digambarpant, an official of Bidar's Barid Shahi kingdom, responsible for collecting land revenue and handing it over to the rulers.

Dasopant wrote mainly in Marathi, was a Sanskrit scholar in which are some of his commentaries. He also composed songs in Kannada, Telugu and Hindi. He is said to have written over 500,000 (5 lakh) couplets, only some of which have been published. He wrote two commentaries on the Gita called 'Gitarnava', and 'Gitarthabodhachandrika' ('Gitartha Chandrika') which is a smaller commentary as compared to his previous book in which he follows the Advaita Siddhanta school of thought. Another book authored by him was the 'Grantharaja', which is considered a precursor of Dasbodh. However, since most of his works lack significant literary qualities, only a small part of them have been published.

References

1551 births
1615 deaths
Marathi-language writers
Indian Sanskrit scholars